This is a list of the National Register of Historic Places listings in Denton County, Texas.

This is intended to be a complete list of the properties and districts on the National Register of Historic Places in Denton County, Texas. There are four districts and 13 individual properties listed on the National Register in the county. Another property was once listed but has been removed. Two individually listed properties are designated Recorded Texas Historic Landmarks including one that is also a State Antiquities Landmark and located within a district. Another district contains an additional Recorded Texas Historic Landmark.

Current listings

The publicly disclosed locations of National Register properties and districts may be seen in a mapping service provided.

|}

Former listing

|}

See also

National Register of Historic Places listings in Texas
Recorded Texas Historic Landmarks in Denton County

References

External links

Registered Historic Places
Denton County